The SU-76 (Samokhodnaya Ustanovka 76) was a Soviet light self-propelled gun used during and after World War II. The SU-76 was based on a lengthened version of the T-70 light tank chassis and armed with the 76 mm divisional gun M1942 (ZiS-3). Its quite simple construction and multipurpose combat role made it the second most produced Soviet armoured fighting vehicle of World War II, after the T-34 medium tank.

History

SU-76

Design of the SU-76 began in November 1942, when the State Defense Committee (GKO) ordered the construction of infantry support self-propelled guns armed with the ZIS-3 76.2 mm divisional field gun and the M-30 122 mm howitzer. The T-70 light tank chassis was chosen for mounting the ZIS-3 gun, and was lengthened, adding one road wheel per side, to facilitate better gun mounting. The vehicle was not completely enclosed by armour, the rear roof and upper rear side exposed. The SU-76 was adopted by the GKO on December 2, 1942.

The first batch of SU-76s (25 units) was manufactured by January 1, 1943 and sent to the self-propelled artillery training center. At the end of January, the first two self-propelled artillery regiments of a mixed organization (1433rd and 1434th) were sent to the Volkhov Front to participate in breaking the blockade of Leningrad. In March 1943, two more regiments were formed - the 1485th and 1487th, which participated in the battles on the Western Front (USSR). However, already after 10 days of military operation in the winter of 1943, most of the SU-76s were out of order due to breakdowns in gearboxes and main shafts. It became obvious that the SU-76 transmission had a design defect, which was the parallel installation of two twin engines that worked on a common shaft. Moreover, the maximum value of the resonant frequency accounted for the most intense mode of operation of the engines (driving in 2nd gear off-road), which led to their rapid failure. Therefore, on March 21, 1943, the production of the SU-76 was suspended. A total of 560 units were made.

SU-76M

A more reliable vehicle, the SU-15, came about as a result of a competition for a light assault SPG armed with a 76.2 mm divisional gun. GAZ and Plant No. 38 took part in the competition. Two chief designers at the GAZ plant, N. A. Astrov and A. A. Lipgart, changed the power-plant arrangement to that of the T-70 light tank - the two engines were mounted in tandem on the right hand side of the vehicle. The armoured roof over the gun compartment was removed to improve access, servicing of the weapon and ventilation. Testing of new self-propelled guns was carried out at the Gorohovets training ground in the midst of the Battle of Kursk. The SU-15 enjoyed the greatest success with the military, and it was recommended for serial production after some modifications. In July 1943, the SU-15 under the army designation SU-76M was adopted by the Red Army.

After production resumed, GAZ and two factories in Kirov and Mytishchi produced 13,732 SU-76Ms; over 9,000 of the vehicles were built solely by GAZ. Mass production of the SU-76M ceased in the second half of 1945. In contemporary accounts SU-76Ms are often referred to in texts, public radio and TV broadcasting as SU-76s with the "M" omitted, due to their ubiquity in comparison with the original SU-76s.

The SU-76 was the basis for the first Soviet tracked armoured anti-aircraft vehicle, the ZSU-37. Mass production of the ZSU-37 was continued after SU-76M production ceased. All SU-76Ms had been withdrawn from front-line service shortly after the war ended, although some were retained as training vehicles for T-34 crews as late as 1955.

Variants 
OSA-76 Experimental model based on the T-60 tank chassis.
SU-76 (factory designation SU-12) Based on a lengthened T-70 light tank chassis, with the inferior dual-engine arrangement of earlier T-70s.  Only 560 were produced, and these were quickly withdrawn from front line service. Nearly all SPGs of this version had armored roof, but it caused ventilation issues and was often removed in field depots, SU-76M lacked roof from start. Combat mass 11,200 kg.
SU-76M (factory designation SU-15) Main production model.
SU-85A/SU-85B SU-76M armed with 85mm gun (D-5S/LB-2 respectively), prototype only.
ZSU-37 Self-propelled anti-aircraft gun, based on the SU-76.

In 1978, Institute 111 from Romania designed an armoured personnel carrier based on the SU-76 chassis, equipped with the TAB-71 turret. The vehicle entered service as the MLVM (meaning "infantry fighting vehicle of vânători de munte").

Unrelated vehicles
The unrelated SU-76i (the "i" standing for "inostrannaya", or 'foreign', in Russian), first designed and fielded in 1943, was based on captured stocks of German Panzer III and StuG III chassis, a large quantity coming from defeated German troops after the Battle of Stalingrad that year. This partially-modified vehicle was armed with an S-1 76.2 mm tank gun (a cheaper variant of the renowned F-34/ZIS-5 guns which were already mounted on T-34 and KV-1 tanks respectively) in a casemate superstructure but retained the original German Maybach gasoline engine and its torsion-bar suspension system. Around 200 of these ex-German vehicles were sent for conversion into SU-76is at Factory No. 37 to supplement the existing SU-76. They were issued to tank and self-propelled gun units starting in the fall of 1943. They were eventually withdrawn from the front in early 1944 and then used for training and testing until the end of 1945. Only 2 have survived the war, most having been scrapped after 1945. A similar vehicle called SG-122 existed, which was a similar Panzer III conversion, but armed with 122 mm M-30 howitzer. Only around 20 were converted, as the M-30 was considered an insufficient weapon for infantry support.

The also unrelated SU-76P (1941) was based on the T-26 chassis. It was built in Leningrad during the Siege of Leningrad and involved removing the turret from the T-26 and mounting a 76 mm regimental gun M1927 on the engine deck. This was created due to the lack of high-explosive 45 mm ammunition inside Leningrad due to the siege, so some T-26 tanks were rearmed with 37mm or 76mm guns for which a reliable source of ammunition was available. They served until 1944, when the siege was broken. They were originally called "SU-76s", until the SU-76 came into service, upon which it was renamed "SU-76P" ("polkovaya" - regimental).

Combat history 

The SU-76M virtually replaced infantry tanks in the close support role. While its thin armour and open top made it vulnerable to antitank weapons, grenades, and small arms, its light weight and low ground pressure gave it good mobility.

The SU-76M combined three main battlefield roles: light assault gun, mobile anti-tank weapon and mobile gun for indirect fire. As a light assault gun, the SU-76M was well-regarded by Soviet infantrymen (in contrast with their own crews). It had more powerful weapons than any previous light tank for close support and communication between infantry and the SU-76M crew was simple due to the open crew compartment. This was extremely useful in urban combat where good teamwork between infantry and AFVs was a key to success. Although the open compartment was highly vulnerable to small arms fire and hand grenades, it very often saved the crew's lives in the case of a hit by a Panzerfaust or Panzerschreck, in which the concussion of the blast would mean death in an enclosed vehicle.

The SU-76M was effective against any medium or light German tank. It could also knock out the Panther tank with a flank shot, but the ZIS-3 gun was not effective against Tiger tanks. Soviet manuals for SU-76M crews usually instructed the gunner to aim for the tracks or gun barrels when facing Tigers. To improve the SU-76M's anti-armour capabilities, armour-piercing composite rigid (APCR) and hollow charge projectiles were introduced. This gave the SU-76M a better chance against heavily armoured German vehicles. A low profile, a low noise signature and good mobility were other advantages of the SU-76M. This was ideal for organizing ambushes and sudden flank or rear strikes in close combat, where the ZIS-3 gun was sufficient against most German armoured fighting vehicles.

The maximum elevation angle of the SU-76M's gun was the highest of all Soviet self-propelled guns. The maximum indirect fire distance was nearly 17 km. SU-76Ms were sometimes used as light artillery vehicles (like the German Wespe) for bombardments and indirect fire support. However the power of the 76.2 mm shells was not sufficient in many cases.

The SU-76M was the single Soviet vehicle able to operate in swamps with minimal support from engineers. During the Belarus liberation campaign in 1944 it was extremely useful for organizing surprise attacks through swamps; bypassing heavy German defenses on firmer ground. Usually only lightly armed infantry could pass through large swampy areas. With SU-76M support, Soviet soldiers and engineers could effectively destroy enemy strongpoints and continue to advance.

The SU-76M had a large number of ammunition types. They included armour-piercing (usual, with ballistic nose and subcaliber hyper-velocity), hollow charge, high explosive, fragmentation, shrapnel and incendiary projectiles. This made the SU-76M an excellent multi-purpose light armoured fighting vehicle.

One famous crewman was Rem Nikolaevich Ulanov. In his younger days he was a mechanic-driver and later a commander of a SU-76. He and some other soldiers called their SU-76 Columbina after the female Renaissance Italian Commedia dell'Arte personage.

After World War II, the SU-76 was used by Communist forces in the Korean War. A small number of SU-76Ms were captured and used by South Korea after the landing at Incheon.

Former operators 

 – 260
 Hungary – 147
 Afghanistan
 – 132

 Romania – 352 acquired by 1957  

 – 30; saw extensive combat during the Vietnam War.

Surviving examples 
Due to the large number of vehicles produced, many SU-76Ms have survived the post-war years, and most of the larger Russian military museums have examples of the SU-76M in their exhibitions. They can also be found at the German-Soviet War monuments or memorials in different Russian, Belarusian, and Ukrainian cities.

In museums

Albania
Museum of Armed Forces 
Australia
The Australian Armour and Artillery Museum (Cairns) SU-76M
Bulgaria
 National Museum of Military History, Sofia.
China
The Chinese Tank Museum (Beijing) SU-76
Poland
 Muzeum Oręża Polskiego in Kołobrzeg - SU-76
 Armoured Weapon Museum in Poznań - SU-76M
 Polish Army Museum in Warsaw
 exhibition in front of the main building - SU-76 tactical number 203, serial number 403062
 Museum of Polish Military Technology -  SU-76 tactical number 207
Romania
 National Military Museum, Romania in Bucharest
Russia
 Central Armed Forces Museum in Moscow
 Technical Museum of Vadim Zadorozhny in Krasnogorsky District, Moscow Oblast - in running condition
 Kubinka Tank Museum in Kubinka, Moscow Oblast
 Museum of Military History in Padikovo, Istrinsky District, Moscow Oblast - in running condition
 Military Historical Museum of Artillery, Engineers and Signal Corps in Saint Petersburg
 Mount Sapun Memorial Complex in Sevastopol
United Kingdom
 The Tank Museum in Bovington - SU-76M captured from North Korea in 1950

See also 
 List of Soviet tanks

Comparable vehicles
 German Marder I, II and III
 Italian Semovente da 75/34
 Romanian TACAM T-60 and TACAM R-2
 Spanish Verdeja 75 mm

References

Further reading 
 Zaloga, Steven J., James Grandsen (1984). Soviet Tanks and Combat Vehicles of World War Two, London: Arms and Armour Press. .
 Dougherty, Martin J. (2008). Tanks; From World War I to the Present Day, New York: Metro Books. 
 Чубачин, Александр (2009). СУ-76. "Братская могила экипажа" или оружие Победы? Москва: БТВ-Книга, Яуза, Эксмо. Chubachin, Alexander V. (2009). SU-76. "Bratskaya mogila ekipazha" ili oruzhie Pobedy? (SU-76. "The Mass Grave of the Crew" or Weapons of Victory?). Moscow: BTV-Kniga, Yauza, Eksmo. .

External links 

 Axis History Factbook
 Su-76  and SU-76i  at Battlefield.ru
 LemaireSoft
 OnWar
 WWII Vehicles
 Interview with an SU-76 gunner

Assault guns of the Soviet Union
World War II tank destroyers
World War II assault guns
76 mm artillery
Military vehicles introduced from 1940 to 1944
World War II armoured fighting vehicles of the Soviet Union
Tracked self-propelled artillery